Ismail Watenga (born 15 May 1995) is a Ugandan professional footballer who plays as a goalkeeper for Vipers S.C.

International career
In January 2014, coach Milutin Sredojević, invited him to be included in the Uganda national football team for the 2014 African Nations Championship. The team placed third in the group stage of the competition after beating Burkina Faso, drawing with Zimbabwe, and losing to Morocco.

References

External links
NFT Profile

Living people
1995 births
People from Mbale District
Uganda A' international footballers
Ugandan footballers
Association football goalkeepers
Uganda international footballers
2014 African Nations Championship players
Vipers SC players
2018 African Nations Championship players